is a traditional rice-planting dance in Akiu, now part of Sendai, Miyagi Prefecture, Japan. Performed since the seventeenth century, ten female dancers accompanied by two or four males enact a repertoire of six to ten dances to the sound of flute, drums and bells. In 1970 measures were taken to document the dance and in 1976 it was designated an Important Intangible Folk Cultural Property. In 2009 Akiu no taue odori was inscribed on the UNESCO Representative List of the Intangible Cultural Heritage of Humanity.

See also
 Japanese traditional dance
 Traditional Japanese music
 List of Important Intangible Folk Cultural Properties
 Representative List of the Intangible Cultural Heritage of Humanity
 Matsuri

References

External links
  UNESCO documentation

Culture in Miyagi Prefecture
Important Intangible Folk Cultural Properties